Harry Newton is the name of:

 Sir Harry Newton, 2nd Baronet (1875–1951), British Conservative politician
 Harry Newton (cricketer) (1935–2014), English cricketer

See also
Harold Newton (disambiguation)
Henry  Newton (disambiguation)